The men's singles event in racquetball at the 2022 World Games took place from 10 to 13 July 2022 at the University of Alabama Birmingham in Birmingham, United States.

Competition format
A total of 16 athletes entered the competition. They competed in knock-out system.

Results

References 

Racquetball at the 2022 World Games
2022 in racquetball